General Ruggles may refer to:

Colden Ruggles (1869–1933), U.S. Army brigadier general
Daniel Ruggles (1810–1897), Confederate States Army brigadier general
George D. Ruggles (1833–1904), U.S. Army brigadier general

See also
Harold Ruggles-Brise (1864–1927), British Army major general